Darya Chultsova (Belarusian: Дар’я Дзмітрыеўна Чульцова, Russian: Дарья Дмитриевна Чульцова) (born on February 20, 1997, in Shklow, Mogilev Region, Belarus) is a journalist from Belarus. She worked for the television channel Belsat TV. She broadcast the event from the Square of Changes in Minsk where Raman Bandarenka was beaten to death in 2020. She was arrested on site on November 15, 2020.

Early life and career 
She was born in Shklow. Being a little girl, she became interested in journalism. During the university years, she worked part-time for the website "Mogilev.Online". She graduated the Department of Journalism of Mogilev State A. Kuleshov University in 2020. In 2020, she moved to the TV channel Belsat TV and worked there as a journalist.

Criminal procedure 

Together with journalist Katsyaryna Andreeva, she became a suspect in a criminal case on organizing actions that attack public order. On November 15, 2020, in Minsk, both broadcast the event of a cruel raid of the Militsiya and its affiliates at the Square of Changes, the place where Raman Bandarenka was beaten to death and the people peacefully stood to support the dead one there.

She was not became free after the arrest at the square. Chultsova was moved to a prison in Zhodzina, where she was held until court trial. On November 24, 2020, ten organizations, including the Viasna Human Rights Centre, the Belarusian Association of Journalists, the Belarusian Helsinki Committee, made a joint statement and recognized her as a political prisoner.

At a Minsk court hearing led by the judge Natalia Buguk on February 18, 2021, Andreeva and Chultsova were sentenced to serve two years in prison for pushing 2020 Belarusian protests. The public prosecutor was Alina Kasyanchyk, the investigator was Ihar Kurylovich.

On April 23, 2021, Minsk City Court declined an appeal on the sentence.

Reaction 
On February 8, 2021, the US Embassy in Belarus made a statement, asking to make Chultsova and Andreeva free.

On February 15, 2021, godparenthood for the political prisoner was undertaken by Tony Lloyd, a member of the House of Commons of the United Kingdom.

Following the sentencing, on February 18, 2021, President of Poland Andrzej Duda made a public call for amnesty for Chultsova and Andreeva.

In accordance with the decision of the Council of the European Union on June 21, 2021, judge Natalia Buguk was included in the list of people and organizations sanctioned in relation to human rights violations in Belarus for, among other things, “numerous politically motivated rulings against journalists and protesters, in particular the sentencing of Katsyaryna Bakhvalava (Andreyeva) and Darya Chultsova” and violations of rights of defence and to a fair trial. By the same decision, the Assistant Prosecutor at the Frunzyenski District Court of Minsk Alina Kasyanchyk was included in the sanctions list. She was held responsible, among other things, for prosecuting journalists for “recording peaceful protests, based on the groundless charges of ‛conspiracy’ and ‛violating public order.’” Senior investigator of the Frunzyenski District Department of the Investigative Committee Ihar Kurylovich was put on the list too for, among other things, preparing a politically motivated criminal case against the journalists who recorded peaceful protests.

Awards 

 On December 10, 2020, she was named Journalist of the Year (2020).
 On March 10, 2021, she got the Award named after Dariusz Fikus by the Press Club Polska.
 Along with Katsyaryna Andreeva and Katsiaryna Barysevich, on April 9, 2021, she got the Ales Lipay (the founder of BelaPAN) Award "Honor of Journalism."
 Along with Katsyaryna Andreeva on June 7, 2021, she got the Axel-Springer-Preis.
 Along with Katsyaryna Andreeva on June 10, 2021, she got the Courage in Journalism Award, a prize by the International Women's Media Foundation.
 Along with Katsyaryna Andreeva, Katsiaryna Barysevich, and others, on August 12, 2021, she got the Free Media Award.
 Along with Katsyaryna Andreeva on October 15, 2021, she got the Prix Europa in the category of the "European Journalist of 2021."

Appraisal 
"[They are] strong in spirit, have no doubt in the right [of them], supported by friends, colleagues and the people that they do not know at all – such Katya and Dasha will be put in textbooks," Aksana Kolb, editor-in-chief of Novy Chas, wrote on the eve of their sentencing.

References

External links 
 Darya Chultsova's page on the website of the Viasna Human Rights Centre

1997 births
Belarusian journalists
Living people
Political prisoners according to Viasna Human Rights Centre
Belarusian women journalists
Free Media Awards winners